In mathematics, the Mercator series or Newton–Mercator series is the Taylor series for the natural logarithm:

In summation notation,

The series converges to the natural logarithm (shifted by 1) whenever  .

History
The series was discovered independently by Johannes Hudde and Isaac Newton. It was first published by Nicholas Mercator, in his 1668 treatise Logarithmotechnia.

Derivation

Alternatively, one can start with the finite geometric series

which gives

It follows that

and by termwise integration,

This expression may be integrated iteratively k more times to yield

where

and

are polynomials in x.

Special cases
Setting  in the Mercator series yields the alternating harmonic series

Complex series
The complex power series

This series converges precisely for all complex number . In fact, as seen by the ratio test, it has radius of convergence equal to 1, therefore converges absolutely on every disk B(0, r) with radius r < 1. Moreover, it converges uniformly on every nibbled disk , with δ > 0. This follows at once from the algebraic identity:
	 	

observing that the right-hand side is uniformly convergent on the whole closed unit disk.

See also
 John Craig

References

 
 Anton von Braunmühl (1903) Vorlesungen über Geschichte der Trigonometrie, Seite 134, via Internet Archive
 Eriksson, Larsson & Wahde. Matematisk analys med tillämpningar, part 3. Gothenburg 2002. p. 10.
 Some Contemporaries of Descartes, Fermat, Pascal and Huygens from A Short Account of the History of Mathematics (4th edition, 1908) by W. W. Rouse Ball

Mathematical series
Logarithms